The men's marathon at the 2006 Asian Games in Doha, Qatar was held on 10 December 2006 at the Marathon Street Circuit in Doha Corniche.

Schedule
All times are Arabia Standard Time (UTC+03:00)

Records

Results 
Legend
DNF — Did not finish

References 

Athletics at the 2006 Asian Games
2006
2006 Asian Games
Asian
2006 Asian Games